The Fajada Gap is a geographical feature in the southwestern portion of Chaco Canyon, which is part of the Chaco Culture National Historical Park located in the U.S. state of New Mexico. Surrounding Fajada Butte, it consists of a conspicuous gap penetrating the Chacra Mesa, which comprises much of the southwestern cliff faces hemming Chaco Canyon. Fajada Gap has historically helped funnel summer and winter thunderstorms and accompanying precipitation into the Chaco Canyon area.

Notes

References 
 .

Chaco Canyon
Landforms of New Mexico
Landforms of San Juan County, New Mexico
Pre-statehood history of New Mexico